Kamalakhya Dey Purkayastha is an Indian politician from the State of Assam, belonging to Indian National Congress. He was elected as MLA of Karimganj North (Vidhan Sabha constituency) for the first time in 2011 defeating the 4 time BJP MLA Mission Ranjan Das, breaking the misfortune of congress in North Karimganj after 25 years, he was once again re elected in 2016.
In 2021, he won for the 3rd consecutive time. He is also the Deputy Chief Whip of Congress Legislative Party in Assam.
He started his political career as a student leader of NSUI. On 24 July 2021, he was appointed the Working President of Assam Pradesh Congress Committee, making him the first congress leader from Barak Valley to be appointed in this post.

References

Indian National Congress politicians from Assam
Assam MLAs 2021–2026
Assam MLAs 2016–2021
Assam MLAs 2011–2016
1977 births
Living people
People from Hailakandi district